Edgar Babayan (born 28 October 1995) is an Armenian professional footballer who plays as a winger for Danish Superliga club Randers FC and the Armenia national team.

Club career

Randers FC
Babayan born in Berlin, Germany, but later moved to Denmark. He started his career at Randers FC.

On 11 November 2013, Babayan got his debut for Randers FC at the age of 18. Babayan started on the bench, but replaced Alexander Fischer in the 83rd minute in a 1–4 defeat against AaB. In February 2014, Babayan signed his first professional- and full-time contract ever, with Randers FC.

Babayan scored his first goal for Randers on 9 July 2015, when he came on the pitch in the 59th minute, replacing Joel Allansson, against Andorran club Sant Julià in the Europa League qualifications. Babayan scored in the 73rd minute on a freekick.

Loan to Hobro IK
On 27 January 2017 it was confirmed, that Babayan would play the rest of the season on a loan at Hobro IK.

Babayan got an injury against Skive IK on 27 February 2017 in a friendly match, before the league began again. The first rumors were, that he had suffered a ligament injury, but later announced, that it only was a bad hamstring in the knee, that would keep him out for about a month.

Babayan went back from the injury in the start of April 2017. He got his debut for Hobro in a 0–0 draw against HB Køge when he in the 69th minute replaced Lucas Jensen. In the next match against Nykøbing FC, Babayan scored two goals in their 3–1 win. Babayan won the Danish 1st Division with Hobro, and the club was promoted to the Danish Superliga again. He was a very important profile in their hunt for promotion.

Hobro IK
After a successful 6-months loan spell, Babayan signed a permanent contract with the newly promoted Danish Superliga club. Babayan quickly became a key player for the team and made his breakthrough during the 2016–17 season. He was rewarded with a new contract in March 2018 until the summer 2021.

On 1 February 2021, Babayan's contract with Hobro was terminated by mutual consent after he bought himself free, with Edgar expressing an interest to play on a higher level.

Riga FC
After leaving Hobro, Babayan joined Latvian Higher League champions, Riga FC, on a free transfer on 15 February 2021. According to rumors from Danish medias, the plan was that Babayan should leave Riga again in the summer to join Cypriot club Pafos FC, who had the same owners as Riga. However, this rumor wasn't confirmed by any official sources.

Babayan got his official debut for the club on 13 March 2021 against FK Ventspils. He came on as a substitute in the 65th minute and scored the last goal in a 3-0 victory.

Pafos FC
On 7 September 2021 Riga FC confirmed, that Babayan's contract had been terminated by mutual agreement and that he would continue his career at Cypriot club Pafos FC. On 25 January 2022, Danish media learned that Babayan had had his contract with Pafos terminated.

Vejle
On 26 January 2022, Babayan joined Danish Superliga club Vejle Boldklub on a deal for the rest of the season. On 16 May 2022, after a total of 15 appearances for Vejle, it was confirmed that Babayan would leave the club at the end of the season, as his contract was expiring.

Return to Randers
After a spell at Vejle, it was confirmed on 7 June 2022, that Babayan would return to his former club, Randers FC, from the upcoming 2022-23 season. Babayan signed a until June 2025.

International career
Babayan was born in Germany to Armenian parents who emigrated to Denmark when he was three. He received his Danish passport in 2016, and one month later got a callup and debut for the Denmark U20 squad in a 2–0 loss to the Italy U20s. Babayan made his debut in a friendly game against Malta on 30 May 2018, where he came in off the bench and played the last 30 minutes.

He scored his first senior international goal on 18 November 2019, in a 9–1 away defeat to Italy, in Armenia's final Euro 2020 qualifier.

International goals
Scores and results list Armenia's goal tally first.

References

External links
 
 Edgar Babayan at DBU

1995 births
Living people
Footballers from Berlin
Armenian footballers
Armenian expatriate footballers
Armenia international footballers
Danish men's footballers
Danish expatriate men's footballers
Denmark youth international footballers
Danish people of Armenian descent
Citizens of Armenia through descent
German emigrants to Denmark
Association football wingers
Danish Superliga players
Danish 1st Division players
Latvian Higher League players
Randers FC players
Hobro IK players
Riga FC players
Pafos FC players
Vejle Boldklub players
Armenian expatriate sportspeople in Cyprus
Danish expatriate sportspeople in Cyprus
Expatriate footballers in Latvia
Expatriate footballers in Cyprus